Sten Stensson Returns (Swedish: Sten Stensson kommer tillbaka) is a 1963 Swedish comedy film directed by Börje Larsson and starring Nils Poppe, Hjördis Petterson and John Norrman. It was shot at the Täby Studios in Stockholm. The film's sets were designed by the art director Per-Olav Sivertzen-Falk. It was the fourth in a series of films feature Poppe in the title role of Sten Stensson.

Cast
 Nils Poppe as 	Sten Stensson Stéen
 Hjördis Petterson as 	Mrs. Agda 
 John Norrman as 	Putte
 Claes Esphagen as 	Olsson
 Sten Lonnert as 	Rulle
 Carl-Axel Elfving as 	Nilsson
 Morgan Andersson as 	Monsieur
 Tage Severin as 	Police-Inspector Gunnar Boklund
 Lena Brundin as	Karin
 Inga-Lill Åhström as 	Sten's mother
 Arthur Fischer as 	Sten's father
 Svea Holst as 	Lady at the bank
 Hilding Rolin as	Supt. Fröberg 
 Gert Landin as 	TV-host
 Sven Holmberg as Prof. Teodor Stark
 Manne Grünberger as TV-judge
 Lill Larsson as 	Prostitute
 Margareta Meyerson as 	Anna-Stina
 Irma Erixson as 	Young blonde girl
 Ena Carlborg as 	Young man
 Signe Stade as 	Young girl
 Anita Wall as 	Pregnant girl
 Gunnar Rosendal as 	Vicar 
 Mona Geijer-Falkner as	Elderly lady

References

Bibliography 
 Qvist, Per Olov & von Bagh, Peter. Guide to the Cinema of Sweden and Finland. Greenwood Publishing Group, 2000.

External links 
 

1963 films
Swedish comedy films
1963 comedy films
1960s Swedish-language films
Films directed by Börje Larsson
Swedish sequel films
1960s Swedish films